Roy Applegate (7 December 1878 – 9 February 1950) was an American actor

Background
He played Judge Gates in The Child of Destiny (1916), Opera House Manager in The Musician's Daughter (1911), Arthur Jepson in All for a Girl (1915), Simon Legree in Uncle Tom's Cabin (1914), Mackenzie in A Man's Law (1918), and Detective in Sally of the Sawdust (1925). He also appeared in The Curious Conduct of Judge Legarde (1915).

Death
He was reported missing since February 9, 1950, and found dead in the bathroom of his home by his sister and brother-in-law due to a heart attack.

Filmography

References

Bibliography

External links

 

1878 births
1950 deaths
People from Bucks County, Pennsylvania
American military personnel of the Spanish–American War
Military personnel from Pennsylvania
American male silent film actors
20th-century American male actors
Male actors from Pennsylvania